The Rofa-Stadion is an arena in Rosenheim, Germany. It is primarily used for ice hockey. Kathrein-Stadion opened in 1973 and holds 6,200 people.

It used to be named the Kathrein-Stadion, after Kathrein-Werke KG, a German manufacturer of antenna systems and related electronics, founded in Rosenheim in 1919.

References

1973 establishments in West Germany
Indoor arenas in Germany
Indoor ice hockey venues in Germany
Rosenheim
Sports venues completed in 1973
Sports venues in Bavaria